Olde English 800 is a brand of American malt liquor produced by the Miller Brewing Company.  It was introduced in 1964 and owned by Miller Brewing Company since 1999.   It is available in a variety of serving sizes including, since the late 1980s, a  bottle.

History

Introduction
Olde English 800, also known as 8 ball or Old E, was introduced in 1964. It had its origins in the late 1940s as Ruff's Olde English Stout, brewed by Peoples Brewing Company of Duluth, Minnesota. Rebranded Olde English 600, it was later sold to Bohemian Breweries of Spokane, Washington, and then to Blitz-Weinhard of Portland, Oregon, where it became Olde English 800. By the time Blitz-Weinhard was sold to the Pabst Brewing Company in 1979, Olde English Malt Liquor had become their top brand.

1980s

In August 1989, when the brand was owned by Pabst and targeted by the brewer towards the "urban contemporary market", a coalition of "22 public interest groups involved in minority issues" criticized the marketing of Olde English – which as a malt liquor has a high alcohol content in comparison to most beers – for what they characterized as an "emphasis on black and Hispanic consumers."

1990s
In 1991, 1992, 1994, and 1995, while still owned by Pabst, Olde English was awarded a gold medal in the American Malt Liquor category at the Great American Beer Festival.  In 1992, Pabst introduced Old English 800 Draft, a cold-filtered instead of pasteurized "draft-style" malt liquor. Olde English received the gold medal in the American Style Specialty Lager category in 1997. The 1999 acquisition of Olde English 800 by Miller meant its share of the U.S. malt liquor business grew to 36 percent; it also led to a "less controversial" marketing strategy for the brand, one that by 2000 included the sponsorship of a series of minority business seminars.

2000s–2010s
In 2010, the 3.2% ABW version of Olde English was rated one of "the worst beer[s] in the world" by RateBeer.com, a beer rating website.

Alcohol content
As of 2010, Olde English 800 is brewed in several versions which vary in alcohol by volume (ABV):

Currently it is available in a 16-ounce [473 ml] pint can, 24-ounce [710 ml] "tallboy" can, or a 22-ounce [651 ml], 40-ounce [1.183 litre] or 42-ounce [1.242 litre] plastic bottle. It was originally available in 12-ounce [355 ml] or 32-ounce [947 ml] "King Size" (c.1999) cans and 22-, 40-, 45- or 64-ounce glass bottles.

References

American beer brands
1964 establishments in the United States